In Greek mythology, Actaeä or Aktaia (Ancient Greek: Ἁκταία Aktaiê means 'the dweller on coasts' from ἁκτή 'seashore') may refer to the following figures:
 Actaea or Actea, the Nereid of rocky shore. These 50 sea-nymphs are daughters of the "Old Man of the Sea" Nereus and the Oceanid Doris. Actaea and her other sisters appeared to Thetis when she cried out in sympathy for the grief of Achilles for his slain friend Patroclus.
 Actaea, a Libyan princess was one of the Danaïdes, daughters of King Danaus and Pieria. She married and murdered her cousin Periphas, son of Aegyptus on their wedding night at the command of her father.
 Actaea, the former name of Attica,whose first king was Actaeus. It was renamed in honour of Atthis, daughter of King Cranaus of Athens.

Notes

References 
Apollodorus, The Library with an English Translation by Sir James George Frazer, F.B.A., F.R.S. in 2 Volumes, Cambridge, MA, Harvard University Press; London, William Heinemann Ltd. 1921. ISBN 0-674-99135-4. Online version at the Perseus Digital Library. Greek text available from the same website.
Bell, Robert E., Women of Classical Mythology: A Biographical Dictionary. ABC-Clio. 1991. .
Gaius Julius Hyginus, Fabulae from The Myths of Hyginus translated and edited by Mary Grant. University of Kansas Publications in Humanistic Studies. Online version at the Topos Text Project.
Hesiod, Theogony from The Homeric Hymns and Homerica with an English Translation by Hugh G. Evelyn-White, Cambridge, MA.,Harvard University Press; London, William Heinemann Ltd. 1914. Online version at the Perseus Digital Library. Greek text available from the same website.
 Homer, The Iliad with an English Translation by A.T. Murray, Ph.D. in two volumes. Cambridge, MA., Harvard University Press; London, William Heinemann, Ltd. 1924. . Online version at the Perseus Digital Library.
Homer, Homeri Opera in five volumes. Oxford, Oxford University Press. 1920. . Greek text available at the Perseus Digital Library.
Kerényi, Carl, The Gods of the Greeks, Thames and Hudson, London, 1951.
Pausanias, Description of Greece with an English Translation by W.H.S. Jones, Litt.D., and H.A. Ormerod, M.A., in 4 Volumes. Cambridge, MA, Harvard University Press; London, William Heinemann Ltd. 1918. . Online version at the Perseus Digital Library
Pausanias, Graeciae Descriptio. 3 vols. Leipzig, Teubner. 1903.  Greek text available at the Perseus Digital Library.
Smith, William. Dictionary of Greek and Roman Biography and Mythology, London: Taylor, Walton, and Maberly (1873). "Actaea"

Nereids
Deities in the Iliad
Danaids